The president of the Chamber of Deputies is the speaker of the lower house of the National Congress of Brazil, elected by his peers for a two-year term. 

Arthur Lira, a deputy from Alagoas and a member of Progressistas, currently holds the office since 1 February 2021.

Role as presiding officer
The President of the Chamber of Deputies is third in line to the president, serves as Vice-President of the Republic in their absence, is a member of the National Defense Council and the Council of the Republic. The President is required to be natively-born in Brazil. The President is the representative of the House when it rules collectively, besides being the supervisor of their work and their order, and chairs the Bureau of the Chamber. 

The Chairman of the Board, during legislative sessions: preside them, maintain order, call upon speakers, check the remaining time of each speaker or aparteante invite the tor to express himself is speaking for or against a particular proposition, interrupt or removing the word speaker who departs from the subject, determining non-inclusion in the minutes or speech aside, inviting Member to withdraw from the enclosure when this is hindering the order, suspend or adjourn the session, to authorize publication of information or documents, appoint Special Committee, after hearing the College Leaders, decide questions of order, announcing the agenda, announcing the project completed by the Commission voting on matters discussed, announce the result of the vote, declaring prejudicial project, organize the agenda, heard the college of leaders, cnvocar sessions, the tie vote overt censorship and apply verbal Representatives.

Also responsible to the President, under the Commissions: appoint the members and alternate means of communication or whatever Leaders of this Regimental after the deadline, the confiscation of the place of Mr missing, ensuring their full operation, request the Rapporteur or another member of Commission convene the Standing Committees to elect their presidents and judge appeal on a point of order and observe and enforce the bylaws of the Chamber of Deputies.

Other duties of the position include: distributing the materials to be discussed between the committees, defer the withdrawal of proposal on the agenda, dispatching requirements, determine the filing or reopening of propositions, determine publicção matter concerning the Voice of Brazil, decide on special session of Congress, to give ownership to Deputies and give them license states the vacant position of Deputy, uphold the prestige and decorum of the House.

Due to their position, can not provide the Chairman Mr proposition as, or to vote in plenary, except in case of a secret ballot or a result of the tie vote ostentatious. While discussing the matter should go over to his deputy, and can not resume prsidência while discussing matters that are proposed to discuss.

List of Presidents of the Chamber of Deputies

Empire of Brazil (1826–1889)

Federative Republic of Brazil (1889–present)

References

See also
President of the Federal Senate (Brazil)
Lista de presidentes da Câmara dos Deputados do Brasil

Legislative branch of Brazil
Brazil, Chamber of Deputies
Brazil